Cabbages and Kings is a 1904 novel made up of interlinked short stories, written by O. Henry and set in a fictitious Central American country called the Republic of Anchuria. It takes its title from the poem "The Walrus and the Carpenter", featured in Lewis Carroll's Through the Looking Glass. Its plot contains famous elements in the poem: shoes and ships and sealing wax, cabbages and kings. It was inspired by the characters and situations that O. Henry encountered in Honduras in the late 1890s.

Chapters
The Proem: By the Carpenter

Cabbages and Kings can be classified as a fix-up novel. In the last chapter of the book, "The Vitagraphoscope", O. Henry suggests that it is a "vaudeville" that is "intrinsically episodic and discontinuous". Some characters do their turn — the vaudeville term for an act — and disappear, and others reappear if only briefly.

New York Times Book Review, Dec 17 1904
"The incidents embracing as they do, a variety of subjects, hang loosely together, so loosely in fact, that at times one finds no apparent connection between them at all, and yet in the end one sees how each is intimately related to the other. ... Written by a less able hand than O. Henry's the book might have been a sad jumble, perhaps comprehensible to none but the Walrus—but as it is, one finds a joy in its every obscurity."

"Banana republic"
In one of the chapters, "The Admiral", inspired by the author's experiences in Honduras, where he had lived for six months, he refers to Anchuria as a "small maritime banana republic"; naturally, the fruit was the entire basis of its economy. According to a literary analyst writing for The Economist, "his phrase neatly conjures up the image of a tropical, agrarian country. But its real meaning is sharper: it refers to the fruit companies from the United States that came to exert extraordinary influence over the politics of Honduras and its neighbors." The expression "banana republic" has been used widely since that time, particularly in political commentaries.

Adaptations 
It has been adapted four times in the USSR and Russia:
 Prezidenty i banany (Президенты и бананы – Presidents and Bananas) – operetta by Moscow Operetta Theater of 1939.
 Kogda more smeyotsya (Когда море смеётся – When the Sea Laughs) — telefilm of 1971, neat adaptation of the book.
  — grotesque movie of 1978.
  — stop-motion animated film of 1996.

References

External links

 

1904 American novels
Books by O. Henry
American novels adapted into films